Caoimhghín Ó Caoláin (born 18 September 1953) is a former Irish Sinn Féin politician who served as a Teachta Dála (TD) for the Cavan–Monaghan constituency from 1997 to 2020. Ó Caoláin's victory in 1997 made him the first member of Sinn Féin to be elected to the Dáil since 1957, and the first to actually take their seat since 1922. His election, which paralleled the signing of the Good Friday Agreement in 1998, is cited as the beginning of Sinn Féin's involvement in the formal national politics of the Republic of Ireland.

Ó Caoláin served as Leader of Sinn Féin in Dáil Éireann from 1997 to 2011 and Chair of the Committee on Justice and Equality from 2016 to 2020.

Biography
Ó Caoláin was born in Monaghan in 1953. He was educated at St. Mary's CBS, Monaghan. He was a bank official with the Bank of Ireland in the 1970s, and worked in a number of towns, including Ballinasloe. He became a senior bank official but then left the bank to concentrate on politics. Ó Caoláin is married to Briege McGinn and they have four daughters and one son.

Ó Caoláin underwent successful cardiac surgery early in 2007. On 19 June 2007, it was reported that he was rushed to hospital, but he was released shortly thereafter and has since made a full recovery.

Political career
Ó Caoláin has been active in republican circles since the 1970s. He was Director of Elections in the Anti H-Block campaign of 1981, which saw Kieran Doherty elected as a TD for the Cavan–Monaghan constituency. Between 1982 and 1985, he was general manager of the republican newspaper An Phoblacht. Ó Caoláin's first political success came in 1985, when he was elected to Monaghan County Council as a Sinn Féin County Councillor. At the 1984 and 1989 European Parliament elections he stood unsuccessfully in the Connacht–Ulster constituency.

Ó Caoláin was a Sinn Féin delegate at the Forum for Peace and Reconciliation in Dublin in the mid-1990s. In 1996, he was an unsuccessful candidate in the Northern Ireland Forum election in Newry and Armagh. He was also a member of the Sinn Féin negotiations team during the talks which led to the Good Friday Agreement in 1998. Following the 1997 general election, he was elected to Dáil Éireann for the Cavan–Monaghan constituency, making him the first Sinn Féin TD elected since 1957, and the first Sinn Féin TD to take his seat at Dáil Éireann in Leinster House since 1922. He was subsequently re-elected at the 2002 general election and was joined by four other Sinn Féin deputies. He was re-elected at the 2007 general election, 2011 general election and 2016 general election. Ó Caoláin served as Sinn Féin's Spokesperson on Health and Children. While a TD, he accepted the average industrial wage and donated the remaining portion of his TD salary to his party.

On 7 March 2018, Ó Caoláin announced that he would not contest the next general election.

References

External links
Caoimhghín Ó Caoláin's page on the Sinn Féin website

 

1953 births
Living people
Local councillors in County Monaghan
Members of the 28th Dáil
Members of the 29th Dáil
Members of the 30th Dáil
Members of the 31st Dáil
Members of the 32nd Dáil
Politicians from County Monaghan
Sinn Féin TDs (post-1923)